Bethel School may refer to:

Bethel School (Monticello, Florida), in Jefferson County, listed on the National Register of Historic Places (NRHP)
Bethel School (Lincolnville, Kansas), in Marion County, NRHP-listed in Marion County

See also
Bethel Christian School (disambiguation)
Bethel High School (disambiguation)
Bethel (disambiguation)